77th Heavy Anti-Aircraft Regiment may refer to:

 77th Heavy Anti-Aircraft Regiment, Royal Artillery, a Regular British Army unit formed in 1947
 77th (Welsh) Heavy Anti-Aircraft Regiment, Royal Artillery, a British Territorial Army unit formed in 1938